Army of God is the first episode of the BBC archaeology drama Bonekickers. It aired on July 8, 2008. It was written by Life on Mars creator Matthew Graham, and filmed in the City of Bath. A small amount of the episode, as with the following episodes, relies on a flashback to the time that the archaeologists are studying.

Characters
Dr. Gillian Magwilde – Julie Graham
Dr. Ben Ergha – Adrian Lester
Professor Gregory "Dolly" Parton – Hugh Bonneville
Vivian "Viv" Davis – Gugu Mbatha-Raw
Professor Daniel Mastiff – Michael Maloney
Edward Laygass – Paul Rhys
"James" – Paul Nicholls
"Colm" – Oliver Jackson Cohen

Plot
The episode is set in the City of Bath, and Gillian Magwilde and her team have been called out to a building site, after builders found Arabian dirhems buried in the site. After being told off briefly by Ben Ergha, Vivian Davis is revealed to be the student archaeologist studying with the team. Gillian has a cold, snubbing attitude towards Viv in the beginning, telling her to simply get on with some cataloguing. But after further inspection of the computerised earth scanner, Viv notices that there is more to the dig site.

Gillian and the rest of the team proceed to excavate the second place, now distinctly forming a crucifix shape when looked at from above. Before long, a skeleton is found, with more dirhems scattered around. This leads to much speculation, as the crusades happened in the Holy Land, not in England.

Before long, however, Gillian and Ben have to leave to go to the launching of a book written by the head of the archaeology department, Daniel Mastiff, entitled Sex Rites of the Ancients. After a few witty remarks on Gillian's part, the two head back to the dig site.

Meanwhile, however, Viv has been looking through the earth, when she finds a 13th-century sandal, and proceeds to show it to the hospice nurse that she has been talking to. The nurse quickly points out another mound, and after inspection, they both proceed to pull a cut of wood out. A splinter from the wood gets stuck in the nurse's finger, as Viv takes the wood back to the lab.

After Gregory "Dolly" Parton completes a test on a scrap of material, the body found is revealed to be a Knight Templar, due to the distinct red cross revealed by the UV light. This raises further questions about Templars in England, with the only explanation being the exile of the Knights by King Philip I of France.

Viv gives Gillian the piece of wood that she found, and after sending Ben to do a dendrochronology test on it, the rest of the team discuss what could have happened. Before serious speculation took place, however, the dendrochronology test was complete, with the wood dating back to 32AD, and with blood soaked into it with metallic traces. Thoughts arise here about whether the wood could be part of the True Cross.

Meanwhile, two Christian fanatics named Jack and Colm prepare themselves with swords for what they call a 'war', and make their way to a mosque, where they pray to God in the sunlight. Four young Muslims enter the building, and after Jack threatens to kill them with his sword, they run away. Jack and Colm leave the place.

While Viv is looking for spare clothes for Gillian, she finds a piece of paper on the back of a picture of Gillian's mother, which has a picture of a sword on it. However, after one of

2008 British television episodes
Television pilots